The Hiranuma Cabinet is the 35th Cabinet of Japan led by Hiranuma Kiichirō from January 5, 1939, to August 30, 1939. The cabinet had to contend and enforce the mobilization of Japan's economic resources for total war started under his predecessor, Fumimaro Konoe who passed the State General Mobilization Law. 

The Hiranuma Cabinet was formed as a result of the collapse of Konoe's first primiership, who had resigned over his failure to negotiate an end to the Second Sino Japanese War after breaking off relations with the Nationalist government.

Cabinet

References 

Cabinet of Japan
1939 establishments in Japan
Cabinets established in 1939
Cabinets disestablished in 1939